The Liberal Party – Freedom to Choose, formerly known as the Whisky Party, is a classical-liberal Finnish political party, founded in 2015 and admitted to the register of political parties in 2016. Its chairman is Lassi Kivinen.

Platform 

The party has a liberal view on alcohol policies, but claims a liberal platform overall. Its platform is to promote individual freedom, entrepreneurship, and decision-making based on scientific research. It opposes the political power of interest groups. It aims to decrease prohibitive restrictions, such as limitations on opening hours of restaurants and strict licensing of taxis. Tax reductions are also on its agenda.

History 

The impetus for founding the Liberal Party was a 2014 event dubbed "Whiskeygate" by the media. A beer and spirits convention was banned from using the name Olut & Viski Expo (Beer & Whiskey Expo) by the authorities, because the name was interpreted as being advertising of spirits prohibited by the law. A party was to be founded in protest to what was perceived as overbearing regulation.

Whiskey Party was founded the next year, in 2015. Just before the 2015 parliamentary election, the then not registered party promoted itself by handing out free portions of Whiskey. The party also published a campaigning song, "Vastuullisesti" ("Responsibly").

After the election, the party continued the practice of publicly serving free whiskey to attract signatures for support cards in the cities of Helsinki, Tampere, and Oulu.

By early February 2016, the party had secured the 5,000 signed support cards needed for registration. On 11 February, it submitted its application to the Ministry of Justice, which maintains the political party register of Finland. The party was officially registered on 18 March 2016.

Soon after the party had gained enough signatures for registration, it was announced that there will be an election about the official name of the party. On 14 May 2016, the party adopted a new name: Liberaalipuolue ("Liberal Party"). The Finnish patent and registration office, however, did not accept the change due to the existence of similarly named associations, such as: Suomen Liberaalinen Puolue ry (Liberal Party of Finland, registered association) and Liberaalit ry (Liberals, registered association).

On 17 June 2016, the party tried to adopt a new name again: The Liberal Party – Freedom to Choose. The name was accepted by the Finnish patent and registration office on 21 June, as the addition to the name was enough to separate it from other associations.

The Liberal Party participated in the municipal elections in 2017 in major cities and allowed as candidates anybody regardless of political experience. The party won 4,117 votes and elected 5 councilors. The Liberal Party also seeks to establish regional chapters.

Electoral performance

European Parliamentary elections

Municipal elections

Parliamentary elections

References

Further reading 

 "Viskipuolueen nimen vaihtaminen liberaalipuolueeksi ei onnistu" [Whiskey Party's change of name to Liberal Party not possible], Verkkouutiset
 "Kommentti: Liberaalipuolue törmäsi heti sääntelyyn" [Comment: Liberal Party immediately ran into regulation], Libero
 "Rekisteriin hyväksytty Viskipuolue vaihtaa nimeä ja tähtää kunnallisvaaleihin" [Registered Whiskey Party changes name and aims for the municipal election], Helsingin Sanomat
 "Viskipuolue: Nyt testataan sääntö-Suomi – 'Haluavatko suomalaiset tätä? [Whiskey Party: Rule-ridden Finland tested – "Is this what Finns want?"], Uusi Suomi
 "Viranomainen torppasi puolueen suuren suunnitelman – Yle: Juhlii tapausta tarjoilemalla viskiä" [Officials deny the grand plan of Whiskey Party – Yle: Party celebrates by serving whiskey], Talouselämä
 "Kolumni: Eipä taida olla viskiveikoista oikeiksi liberaaleiksi" [Column: Whiskey folk is unlikely to be real liberals], Aamulehti
 "Viskipuolue hyväksyttiin puoluerekisteriin" [Whiskey Party registered], Satakunnan Kansa
 "Korkataanko huomenna puolueelle uusi nimi? – Viskipuolue voi muuttua Liberaaleiksi" [Will the party pop open a new name tomorrow? – Whiskey Party might turn into Liberals], Helsingin Uutiset
 "Fundan en Finlandia el "Partido Nacional del Whisky ["National Whiskey Party" founded in Finland], EFE
 "Le premier Parti du whisky voit le jour en Finlande" [The first Whiskey Party founded in Finland], Le Nouvelliste
 "Politiikan new kids on the block" [New kids on the block of politics], Voima
 "Viskipuolue muuttaa nimensä sittenkin – 'Sanaan liberaali ei voi saada yksinoikeutta [Whiskey Party changes its name afteral – "The word liberal is not exclusive"] Yle

External links 

  
 Registration data at the Finnish patent and registration office
 Whiskey Party on YleX 
 Interview with vice chairman Tuomas Tiainen on Yle Radio Puhe 
  

Liberal parties in Finland
Political parties established in 2015
Registered political parties in Finland
2015 establishments in Finland
Classical liberal parties